Bert G. Fragner (27 November 1941 – 16 December 2021) was an Austrian Iranologist.

Career
He was director of the Institute of Iranian Studies of the Austrian Academy of Sciences from 2003 - 2010. Before Fragner taught Iranology at the University of Bamberg from 1984 – 2003. He made several research trips to Central Asia.

On 16 July 2010, Fragner was awarded the Dr. Mahmud Afshar Prize at the Academy of Sciences in Vienna, for helping to promote Persian and Iranian culture and history.

Fragner died on 16 December 2021, at the age of 80.

References

Bibliography

 Fragner, Bert G. (1999). Die Persophonie: Regionalität, Identität und Sprachkontakt in der Geschichte Asiens. Berlin: Das Arabische Buch. . 
 Fragner, Bert G. (2000). "From the Caucasus to the Roof of the World: a culinary adventure". In Sami Zubaida and Richard Tapper: A Taste of Thyme: Culinary Cultures of the Middle East (2nd ed.). London & New York: Tauris Parke Paperbacks. .

1941 births
2021 deaths
Place of birth missing
Austrian academics
Iranian Science and Culture Hall of Fame recipients in Humanities
Iranologists
Academic staff of the University of Bamberg